Letschin is a municipality in the district of Märkisch-Oderland, in Brandenburg, Germany.

The municipality has ten subdivisions:

Demography

People 
 Katja Havemann (born 1947), civil right activists and author

References

External links

Localities in Märkisch-Oderland